The  Comarca de Las Vegas is a informal comarca, defined by the  Guía de Turismo Rural y Activo,  edited by Directorate General of Tourism (Consejería de Cultura y Turismo) of the Community of Madrid, it covers some 1378,13 km² and is bound geographically by three rivers Tajo, Tajuña and Jarama. The capital is Aranjuez.

Municipalities in El Comarca de Las Vegas 
The comarca comprises several villages and settlements whose surface area and population in the year 2006 was:.

{| class="wikitable" border="1"
! Municipality  || Surface area || Population
|-
| Total comarca
| align=right | 1378,13
| align=right | 135171
|-
| Ambite
| align=right | 26
| align=right | 394
|-
| Aranjuez
| align=right | 189,13
| align=right | 52224
|-
| Belmonte de Tajo
| align=right | 23,71
| align=right | 1266
|-
| Brea de Tajo
| align=right | 44,33
| align=right | 516
|-
| Carabaña
| align=right | 47,58
| align=right | 1526
|-
| Chinchón
| align=right | 115,91
| align=right | 4943
|-
| Ciempozuelos
| align=right | 49,64
| align=right | 18764
|-
| Colmenar de Oreja
| align=right | 114,32
| align=right | 7247
|-
| Estremera
| align=right | 79,1
| align=right | 1297
|-
| Fuentidueña
| align=right | 60,59
| align=right | 1799
|-
| Morata de Tajuña
| align=right | 45,2
| align=right | 6548
|-
| Orusco de Tajuña
| align=right | 21,51
| align=right | 1017
|-
| Perales de Tajuña
| align=right | 48,92
| align=right | 2469
|-
| San Martín de la Vega
| align=right | 105,93
| align=right | 15677
|-
| Tielmes
| align=right | 26,88
| align=right | 2468
|-
| Titulcia
| align=right | 9,95
| align=right | 914
|-
| Valdaracete
| align=right | 64,31
| align=right | 604
|-
| Valdelaguna
| align=right | 42,13
| align=right | 741
|-
| Valdilecha
| align=right | 42,48
| align=right | 2326
|-
| Villaconejos
| align=right | 32,97
| align=right | 3070
|-
| Villamanrique de Tajo
| align=right | 29,32
| align=right | 701
|-
| Villar del Olmo
| align=right | 27,62
| align=right | 1947
|-
| Villarejo de Salvanés
| align=right | 118,62
| align=right | 6713
|}

See also 
 Community of Madrid
 List of municipalities in Madrid

References

External links 
 Web oficial de la Comarca de Las Vegas
 Asociación de Desarrollo Rural Aranjuez-Comarca de las Vegas (ARACOVE)
La Guerra Civil en la Comarca de las Vegas

Comarcas of the Community of Madrid
NUTS 2 statistical regions of the European Union
States and territories established in 1983